Chhatrapati Shahu Ji Maharaj University (CSJMU), formerly Kanpur University, is a public state university located in Kanpur, Uttar Pradesh, India. It is administered under the state legislature of the government of Uttar Pradesh.

Administration
The administration is the Chancellor, the Vice Chancellor and the members of the executive council, the court and the academic council of the university.

The Kulpati (Vice-Chancellor) is a whole-time salaried officer of the university and is appointed by the chancellor from amongst the names submitted to him by a committee constituted in accordance with the provisions above U.P. Universities Act 1973.

Colleges
The university is affiliating university all non engineering, non medical (including pharmacy), non MBA degree, non MCA degree offering colleges of Auraiya district, Etawah district, Farrukhabad district, Kannauj district, Kanpur Dehat district, Kanpur Nagar district and  Unnao district from the year of 2020. Notable affiliated colleges include DAV College, Kanpur, Vikramajit Singh Sanatan Dharma College, Christ Church College, Kanpur, Chaudhary Charan Singh Post Graduate College etc.

Formerly affiliated institutions
The list of formerly affiliated notable college who now have university status or now affiliated with another university-
Harcourt Butler Technical University (1968 to 2000)
Chandra Shekhar Azad University of Agriculture and Technology (1968 to 1975)
Uttar Pradesh University of Medical Sciences (2006 to 2016)
Ganesh Shankar Vidyarthi Memorial Medical College (1968 to 2021)

Notable alumni

Government and politics

Ram Nath Kovind, 14th President of India
Harsh Vardhan, ex-Minister of Science and Technology, Environment, Forest and Climate Change and Earth Sciences, attended Ganesh Shankar Vidyarthi Memorial Medical College, graduated in 1979 with a Bachelor of Medicine, Bachelor of Surgery
Gopal Khanna, 5th director of the Agency for Healthcare Research and Quality
Shivpal Singh Yadav, MLA and former Cabinet Minister in Uttar Pradesh Government
Anupriya Patel, MP & former State Minister in Government of India
Ram Gopal Yadav, MP
Naresh Uttam Patel, MLC and state president of Samajwadi Party (Uttar Pradesh)
Lalji Verma, MLA
Nafees Ahmad, MLA
Harvindar Kumar Sahani, MLA
Sarita Bhadauria, MLA 
Adesh Kumar Gupta, state president of Bhartiya Janta Party (Delhi) 
Sone Lal Patel, founder of Apna Dal
Subhashini Ali, former MP and Polit Beuro member of Communist Party of India (Marxist)
Annu Tandon, former MP
Premdas Katheria, former MP
Sushila Saroj, former MP
Ashok Kumar Doharey, former MP
Arvind Pratap, former MLC

Academics

Renu Khator, chancellor of the University of Houston System and president of the University of Houston
Sarvagya Singh Katiyar, former vice chancellor of Chhatrapati Shahu Ji Maharaj University, Padma Bhushan and Padma Shri.
Onkar Singh, vice-chancellor of Veer Madho Singh Bhandari Uttarakhand Technical University and founder vice chancellor of Madan Mohan Malaviya University of Technology 
Raj Kumar, founder director of All India Institute of Medical Sciences, Rishikesh and former vice chancellor of Uttar Pradesh University of Medical Sciences
Rakesh Bhatnagar, former vice chancellor of Banaras Hindu University
Ghanshyam Swarup, Molecular biologist, Shanti Swarup Bhatnagar laureate
Hargovind Bhargava, Economist

Others

Mohammad Kaif, cricketer (dropout)
Anny Divya,  pilot, attended Indira Gandhi Rashtriya Uran Akademi, graduated  with a Bachelor of Science in Aviation
Veena Sahasrabuddhe, vocalist and composer of Hindustani classical music
Rahul Mishra, won the International Woolmark Prize in 2014 at Milan Fashion Week

References

External links
Official website

 
Universities and colleges in Kanpur
Kanpur division
Universities in Uttar Pradesh
Educational institutions established in 1966
1966 establishments in Uttar Pradesh